Justin Craig Williams (born October 4, 1981) is a 
Canadian-American former professional ice hockey right winger. He played in the National Hockey League (NHL) for the Philadelphia Flyers, Carolina Hurricanes, Los Angeles Kings, and Washington Capitals.

Williams won the Stanley Cup three times: in 2006 with the Hurricanes and in 2012 and 2014 with the Kings. Nicknamed "Mr. Game 7", Williams played nine game seven playoff games in his NHL career, with his team sporting a 8–1 record in these games. He currently is tied for most goals in these games with Glenn Anderson at seven, and has the outright record for most game seven points, with 15. Williams won the Conn Smythe Trophy as Most Valuable Player of the playoffs in 2014 with the Kings.

Playing career

Junior
Williams grew up in Cobourg, Ontario, and played minor hockey in nearby Port Hope in the Ontario Minor Hockey Association (OMHMA) before gaining a reputation as a skilled goon with the Cobourg Cougars of the Ontario Provincial Junior A Hockey League in 1997–98. His favourite players growing up were Sergei Fedorov and Wayne Gretzky.

Williams was drafted in the sixth round, 125th overall, by the Ontario Hockey League (OHL)'s Plymouth Whalers in the 1998 OHL Priority Selection. He was signed as a 16-year-old by the Whalers and split time between the OHL club and their affiliate, the Compuware Jr. A. club of the North American Hockey League (NAHL), during the 1998–99 season. He finished his junior career with two seasons played for Plymouth.

Professional

Philadelphia Flyers (2000–2004)
Williams was drafted in the first round, 28th overall, by the Philadelphia Flyers in the 2000 NHL Entry Draft. In four seasons played with the Flyers, Williams struggled to live up to expectations, as he tried to adapt to the varying systems of three separate coaches – Craig Ramsay (2000), Bill Barber (2000–2002) and Ken Hitchcock (2002–2006). Williams was also frequently injured, which simultaneously hampered his development. He broke his left hand in his rookie season (hit by David Tanabe of the Carolina Hurricanes) and had various sprains and strains in his sophomore year. Williams also suffered a left knee injury on January 18, 2003, when he was hit low by the Tampa Bay Lightning's Brad Lukowich. The hit tore Williams' anterior cruciate ligament (ACL) and medial collateral ligament (MCL), and, on January 23, 2003, he had surgery to repair the ligaments. Originally projected to miss four to eight months recovering from the injury, Williams made it back into Philadelphia's line-up in just three months.

Carolina Hurricanes (2004–2009)
On January 20, 2004, Williams was traded to the Carolina Hurricanes in exchange for defenceman Danny Markov. During the 2004–05 NHL lockout, he went overseas to play for Luleå HF of the Swedish Elitserien, where he recorded 14 goals and 18 assists in 49 games.

Williams signed a one-year contract with the Hurricanes for the 2005–06 season, when he set career-highs in games played (82), goals (31), assists (45), points (76) and penalty minutes (60). In the 2006 Eastern Conference Quarterfinals, Williams injured Montreal Canadiens captain Saku Koivu in the eye without being penalized in Game 3, despite Montreal receiving a double minor penalty for high sticking in overtime. Saku Koivu missed the remainder of the playoffs due to the injury. 

Williams scored the final goal of the 2006 Stanley Cup Finals, an empty net goal at 18:59 of the third period of Game 7. With the score 2–1, a loose puck along the boards ended up on the stick of Bret Hedican, who passed it to Eric Staal. Seeing Williams open, Staal threw the puck down the ice to him. Williams skated down the ice and tapped the puck into the open net, sealing the Hurricanes' first Stanley Cup in franchise history. The Hurricanes won the series 4–3.

On July 1, 2006, Williams signed a new five-year contract with the Hurricanes worth $3.5 million per season.

In 2006–07, Williams recorded career-highs in goals (33), penalty minutes (73), power play goals (12) and game-winning goals (8). It was Williams' second consecutive season of 82 games played. Williams made his first appearance in an NHL All-Star game at the 2007 NHL All-Star Game in Dallas, recording a goal and an assist. Williams also played for Canada in the 2007 IIHF World Championship, in which he won his second gold medal.

Williams was off to a good start for his 2007–08 season, with 30 points in 36 games (9 goals, 21 assists), before his season ended: on December 20, 2007, during the first period of a game with the Florida Panthers, Williams suffered a torn ACL and MCL in his left knee after a hit by Rostislav Olesz. Williams underwent successful surgery for the torn ligaments on December 26, 2007, and returned on April 1, 2008, only to leave the game with an unrelated back injury.

On September 17, 2008, Williams was thought to be sidelined for four-to-six months when he tore his right Achilles tendon in an off-ice, pre-season workout. Williams underwent surgery for the injury the following day, on September 18. Williams again surprised fans and analysts when he returned from his injury on December 4, 2008, more than one month earlier than his earliest projected return date. He was greeted by a round of applause on his first shift by the crowd, and played his first full NHL game in nearly 11 months. He played 32 games before he was again injured, this time by a teammate's slap shot, which broke his left hand.

Los Angeles Kings (2009–2015)

On March 5, 2009, Williams was traded to the Los Angeles Kings in exchange for Patrick O'Sullivan and the Calgary Flames' second-round draft pick.

On February 28, 2011, Williams signed a new four-year, $14.6 million contract with Los Angeles. He scored 15 points in the 2012 playoffs, helping the Kings win their first Stanley Cup.

During the 2012–13 season, Williams scored 11 goals with 22 assists, as the Kings would ultimately lose to the eventual Stanley Cup champions Chicago Blackhawks in the Western Conference Finals of the 2013 playoffs.

Williams won the Conn Smythe Trophy as the most valuable player in the 2014 playoffs, where he won his third Stanley Cup and second with the Kings. He scored 9 goals and 15 assists during the playoffs, including the game-winning goal in Game 1 the Finals against the New York Rangers, and the Kings' first in the 3–2 comeback in Game 5 to win the Cup. Williams also had points in all three Game 7 matches the Kings had en route to the Finals.

Washington Capitals (2015–2017)
On July 1, 2015, Williams signed a two-year, $6.25 million contract with the Washington Capitals. He would play his 1,000th NHL game on April 10, 2016. Despite the team winning back-to-back Presidents' Trophies, the Capitals could not advance past the second round in either season.

Return to Carolina and retirement (2017–2020)
On July 1, 2017, Williams returned to the Hurricanes, signing a two-year, $9 million contract.

On September 13, 2018, Williams was named the captain of the Hurricanes, replacing the co-captaincy of Jordan Staal and Justin Faulk. The Hurricanes qualified for the 2019 Stanley Cup Playoffs. The team reached the Eastern Conference Final, losing in four straight to the Boston Bruins. Williams finished with seven points in 15 games.

As a free agent during the 2019 off-season, Williams was undecided on whether he would return to professional hockey. If he chose to return, it would only be with the Hurricanes. On September 2, Williams announced he had "decided to step away from the game."

On January 7, 2020, Williams returned to the Hurricanes, signing a one-year, $700,000 contract. In his return to the lineup on January 19, he scored the game-deciding shootout goal to defeat the New York Islanders 2–1.

On October 8, 2020, Williams announced his retirement from professional hockey after a 19-season NHL career.

After retiring, Williams was hired as a “special advisor” to Hurricanes general manager Don Waddell.

Personal life
Williams married his fiancée, Kelly, on August 12, 2006. The couple have two children together: a son and a daughter. They bought a house in Ventnor, New Jersey, in 2009. The family moved to Cary, North Carolina in 2016, and played a role in Williams' decision to return to the Hurricanes.

Williams' great-uncle Zellio Toppazzini was a professional ice hockey player who played 123 games in the NHL with the New York Rangers, Boston Bruins and Chicago Blackhawks and was inducted into the American Hockey League (AHL) Hall of Fame in 2012. Williams is the grandnephew of Jerry Toppazzini, a forward who played 12 seasons in the NHL, most notably for the Boston Bruins.

Williams is a dual citizen of Canada and the United States, having acquired American citizenship by naturalization in June 2017.

Career statistics

Regular season and playoffs

International

Awards and honours

NHL

References

External links

 

1981 births
Living people
Canadian expatriate ice hockey players in Sweden
Canadian ice hockey right wingers
Carolina Hurricanes players
Conn Smythe Trophy winners
Franco-Ontarian people
Ice hockey people from Ontario
Los Angeles Kings players
Luleå HF players
National Hockey League All-Stars
National Hockey League first-round draft picks
People from Cobourg
People from Ventnor City, New Jersey
Philadelphia Flyers draft picks
Philadelphia Flyers players
Plymouth Whalers players
Naturalized citizens of the United States
Stanley Cup champions
Washington Capitals players